Kangri ulcers are a cutaneous condition prevalent among the poorer classes of Kashmir, and a consequence of wearing warm embers. It is unique to this area and may progress to Kangri cancer.

See also 
 Marjolin's ulcer
 Peat fire cancer
 List of cutaneous conditions

References 

Skin conditions resulting from physical factors